Altachullion Upper is a townland in the civil parish of Templeport, County Cavan, Ireland. It lies in the Roman Catholic parish of Corlough and barony of Tullyhaw. A sub-division is called The Tebente - a name given to a field which in 1938 was the property of Mrs McGoldrick.

Geography

Altachullion Upper is bounded on the north by Altachullion Lower townland, on the south by Altateskin townland, on the west by Legnaderk and Altnadarragh townlands and on the east by Altinure, Tullyloughfin and Tullynamoltra  townlands. Its chief geographical features are mountain streams, gravel pits, springs and dug wells. Altachullion Upper is traversed by minor public roads and rural lanes. The townland covers 271 statute acres,.

History

In earlier times the townland was probably uninhabited as it consists mainly of bog and poor clay soils. It was not seized by the English during the Plantation of Ulster in 1610, nor in the Cromwellian Settlement of the 1660s; so some dispossessed Irish families moved there and began to clear and farm the land.

The earliest reference to the townland is on a map dated 1813 where it is called "Altaghullen".

In the 19th century the landlord was Lord John Beresford, the Protestant Archbishop of Armagh. The muddled previous land history of the area is described in the 1838 Exchequer case, "Attorney General of Ireland v The Lord Primate". The maps used in the case are viewable online at 

The Tithe Applotment Books for 1826 list twelve tithepayers in the townland.

The Ordnance Survey Name Books for 1836 give the following description of the townland: It is bounded on the north side by a large stream which rises in the mountain and runs towards the southeast. ...a flax kiln.

The Altachullion Upper Valuation Office Field books are available for August 1839.

Griffith's Valuation of 1857 lists seven landholders in the townland.

Antiquities

The only structure of historical interest in the townland is

  A footbridge over the stream

References

External links
The IreAtlas Townland Data Base

Townlands of County Cavan